Phillip Reyes was a member of the Duarte City Council and was the city's mayor in 1996, 2002, and 2008. In November 2013, he lost his seat in the municipal elections.

Reyes was first elected to the Duarte City Council in 1993, and was re-elected in 1997, 2001, 2005 and 2009. He has many accomplishments under his belt, such as being a president of the League of United Latin American Citizens, a member of the California State Department of Education as part of the Diversity Committee in 1996, member of the League of California Cities, National League of Cities, National Association of Latino Elected Officials, Hispanic Elected Local Officials, and League of United Latin American Citizens, and was also chairman of the San Gabriel Valley Boy Scouts District. He also helped initiate the DAMAGE program as well as explorer program at Duarte High School, both of which resulted in the reduction of crime citywide.

Several City of Duarte employees alleged in 2002 that Reyes engaged in various instances of misconduct toward them during his tenure as mayor that year. The city hired Trudy Largent of Trudy Largent & Associates to investigate the allegations.  Largent performed the investigation and privately submitted a report of her findings to the city council; a portion of the report was publicized for a time on the city's web site.

Reyes is married to his wife Angie for over 32 years, and they live in Duarte for over 30 of those years. They have three children; Phillip, Gabriel, and Alexis, as well as two granddaughters, Emily and Gia. He has been a licensed real estate broker and realtor since 1978. His brother Tom was a first-time candidate for governing board member of the Duarte Unified School District in the 2009 municipal elections.

References

External links
official web site
Twitter: PhilRReyes
Facebook: Phil Reyes
MySpace: Phil Reyes
official Duarte website profile

21st-century Roman Catholics
Living people
Mayors of places in California
People from Duarte, California
Year of birth missing (living people)